Big Bad Beautiful World is the second full-length album by Declan O'Rourke.

Track listing
"Big Bad Beautiful World"
"Save Your Soul"
"Make Something"
"Whatever Else Happens"
"Man of Peace"
"Just to Be Friends"
"One Day In A War"
"Being Your Friend"
"A Song On Love And Hate"
"Stay In Sight"
"Silly Days"
"Twinkle Twinkle"

References 

2007 albums
Declan O'Rourke albums